Alexa Centre (Alexa Einkaufszentrum) or simply Alexa, is a shopping centre near Alexanderplatz in Berlin, Germany. Over one million people visit the Alexa Centre per month (for example, there was an average of 1.1 million visitors during the first quarter of 2009).

See also
 List of shopping malls in Germany

References

External links
 

Buildings and structures in Berlin
Economy of Berlin
Mitte
Shopping malls in Berlin